Snooker world ranking points 2008/2009: The official world ranking points for the 96 professional snooker players in the 2008–09 season are listed below. The total points from the seasons 2007–08 and 2008–09 were used to determine the ranking for the season 2009/2010.

Ranking points 
{| class="wikitable sortable" style="text-align: center;"
|-
! scope=col class=unsortable | No.
! scope=col class=unsortable |  Ch 
! scope=col width="200pt" | Player
! scope=col | Points 07/08
! scope=col | NIT
! scope=col | SM
! scope=col | GP
! scope=col | BC
! scope=col | UK
! scope=col | WO
! scope=col | CO
! scope=col | WSC
! scope=col | Points 08/09
! scope=col | Total
|-
| 1 ||  || style="text-align:left;"| Ronnie O'Sullivan
| 29700 || 5000 || 4000 || 3125 || 700 || 2850 || 1900 || 2500 || 3800 || 23875 || 53575
|-
| 2 ||  || style="text-align:left;"| Stephen Maguire
| 25975 || 2500 || 3200 || 875 || 2500 || 4800 || 2500 || 700 || 5000 || 22075 || 48050
|-
| 3 ||  || style="text-align:left;"| Shaun Murphy
| 23700 || 700 || 700 || 875 || 700 || 7500 || 2500 || 2500 || 8000 || 23475 || 47175
|-
| 4 ||  1 || style="text-align:left;"| John Higgins
| 14825 || 3200 || 1900 || 6250 || 0 || 3750 || 1900 || 4000 || 10000 || 31000 || 45825
|-
| 5 || 2 || style="text-align:left;"| Ali Carter
| 18425 || 3200 || 700 || 4000 || 700 || 4800 || 5000 || 1900 || 3800 || 24100 || 42525
|-
| 6 || 2 || style="text-align:left;"| Ryan Day
| 19425 || 1900 || 2500 || 5000 || 1900 || 1050 || 700 || 3200 || 5000 || 21250 || 40675
|-
| 7 || 3 || style="text-align:left;"| Mark Selby
| 20050 || 1900 || 3200 || 2375 || 0 || 1050 || 2500 || 1900 || 5000 || 17925 || 37975
|-
| 8 || 6 || style="text-align:left;"| Marco Fu
| 18075 || 700 || 2500 || 2375 || 700 || 6000 || 2500 || 700 || 3800 || 19275 || 37350
|-
| 9 || 1 || style="text-align:left;"| Neil Robertson
| 12400 || 700 || 1900 || 875 || 5000 || 2850 || 3200 || 1900 || 6400 || 22825 || 35225
|-
| 10 || 4 || style="text-align:left;"| Stephen Hendry
| 16900 || 700 || 700 || 2375 || 3200 || 1050 || 700 || 2500 || 5000 || 16225 || 33125
|-
| 11 || 5 || style="text-align:left;"| Mark Allen
| 15075 || 2500 || 575 || 875 || 3200 || 2850 || 700 || 700 || 6400 || 17800 || 32875
|-
| 12 ||  || style="text-align:left;"| Joe Perry
| 18250 || 1900 || 1900 || 2375 || 1900 || 3750 || 700 || 700 || 1400 || 14625 || 32875
|-
| 13 || 2 || style="text-align:left;"| Ding Junhui
| 15869 || 700 || 700 || 3125 || 0 || 2850 || 1900 || 700 || 3800 || 13775 || 29644
|-
| 14 || 5 || style="text-align:left;"| Peter Ebdon
| 14975 || 700 || 700 || 2375 || 700 || 2850 || 700 || 5000 || 1400 || 14425 || 29400
|-
| 15 || 7 || style="text-align:left;"| Mark Williams
| 15100 || 1900 || 2500 || 719 || 575 || 3750 || 575 || 1400 || 2800 || 14219 || 29319
|-
| 16 || 1 || style="text-align:left;"| Mark King
| 13675 || 700 || 1900 || 875 || 700 || 2850 || 1900 || 1900 || 3800 || 14625 || 28300
|-
| 17 || 10 || style="text-align:left;"| Barry Hawkins
| 12975 || 2500 || 1400 || 1750 || 2500 || 2100 || 575 || 575 || 2800 || 14200 || 27175
|-
| 18 || 1 || style="text-align:left;"| Jamie Cope
| 12869 || 1400 || 1900 || 3125 || 700 || 863 || 575 || 1400 || 3800 || 13763 || 26632
|-
| 19 || 9 || style="text-align:left;"| Dave Harold
| 12244 || 4000 || 1900 || 1750 || 1400 || 863 || 1400 || 1900 || 1150 || 14363 || 26607
|-
| 20 || 15 || style="text-align:left;"| Ricky Walden
| 10225 || 1150 || 5000 || 1750 || 1400 || 675 || 1150 || 1900 || 2800 || 15825 || 26050
|-
| 21 ||  || style="text-align:left;"| Stuart Bingham
| 14775 || 575 || 1900 || 719 || 1400 || 2100 || 575 || 575 || 2800 || 10644 || 25419
|-
| 22 || 2 || style="text-align:left;"| Joe Swail
| 12975 || 575 || 575 || 719 || 575 || 2100 || 4000 || 575 || 2800 || 11919 || 24894
|-
| 23 || 6 || style="text-align:left;"| Steve Davis
| 9569 || 575 || 2500 || 3125 || 1900 || 2100 || 1400 || 575 || 2800 || 14975 || 24544
|-
| 24 || 10 || style="text-align:left;"| Michael Holt
| 8950 || 1400 || 1150 || 2375 || 1900 || 2100 || 1150 || 1400 || 2800 || 14275 || 23225
|-
| 25 || 1 || style="text-align:left;"| Stephen Lee
| 9569 || 1900 || 575 || 719 || 1900 || 3750 || 575 || 1400 || 2800 || 13619 || 23188
|-
| 26 || 9 || style="text-align:left;"| Matthew Stevens
| 10463 || 575 || 1400 || 719 || 4000 || 2850 || 1400 || 575 || 1150 || 12669 || 23132
|-
| 27 || 13 || style="text-align:left;"| Liang Wenbo
| 10500 || 1900 || 1400 || 1750 || 1150 || 1725 || 1150 || 450 || 2800 || 12325 || 22825
|-
| 28 || 15 || style="text-align:left;"| Graeme Dott
| 8469 || 700 || 700 || 875 || 700 || 2850 || 1900 || 2500 || 3800 || 14025 || 22494
|-
| 29 || 6 || style="text-align:left;"| Nigel Bond
| 13275 || 575 || 575 || 719 || 575 || 863 || 575 || 1400 || 3800 || 9082 || 22357
|-
| 30 || 10 || style="text-align:left;"| Judd Trump
| 7701 || 1150 || 1400 || 4000 || 1400 || 2100 || 450 || 1400 || 2300 || 14200 || 21901
|-
| 31 || 7 || style="text-align:left;"| Fergal O'Brien
| 12713 || 575 || 1400 || 719 || 575 || 863 || 1400 || 1400 || 1150 || 8082 || 20795
|-
| 32 || 1 || style="text-align:left;"| Gerard Greene
| 10238 || 1150 || 1150 || 563 || 575 || 1725 || 1150 || 1400 || 2800 || 10513 || 20751
|-
| 33 || 2 || style="text-align:left;"| Anthony Hamilton
| 9775 || 575 || 1400 || 1750 || 575 || 863 || 3200 || 1400 || 1150 || 10913 || 20688
|-
| 34 || 2 || style="text-align:left;"| Dominic Dale
| 11313 || 1400 || 700 || 719 || 2500 || 863 || 1400 || 575 || 1150 || 9307 || 20620
|-
| 35 || 10 || style="text-align:left;"| Ian McCulloch
| 10494 || 2500 || 575 || 719 || 575 || 2100 || 575 || 575 || 1150 || 8769 || 19263
|-
| 36 || 6 || style="text-align:left;"| Michael Judge
| 10750 || 575 || 575 || 719 || 1900 || 863 || 1900 || 575 || 1150 || 8257 || 19007
|-
| 37 || 25 || style="text-align:left;"| Stuart Pettman
| 7163 || 1400 || 1400 || 407 || 900 || 1350 || 1150 || 3200 || 1800 || 11607 || 18770
|-
| 38 || 9 || style="text-align:left;"| Mike Dunn
| 8451 || 1150 || 1150 || 563 || 1900 || 675 || 1400 || 1150 || 2300 || 10288 || 18739
|-
| 39 || 5 || style="text-align:left;"| Rory McLeod
| 7925 || 1400 || 450 || 1438 || 1150 || 2100 || 450 || 450 || 2800 || 10238 || 18163
|-
| 40 || 5 || style="text-align:left;"| Jamie Burnett
| 6638 || 450 || 1150 || 1750 || 450 || 2100 || 1400 || 1150 || 2800 || 11250 || 17888
|-
| 41 || 4 || style="text-align:left;"| Alan McManus
| 7938 || 1900 || 1150 || 1438 || 450 || 1725 || 450 || 450 || 2300 || 9863 || 17801
|-
| 42 || 6 || style="text-align:left;"| Adrian Gunnell
| 9550 || 1150 || 450 || 2375 || 450 || 1725 || 450 || 450 || 900 || 7950 || 17500
|-
| 43 || 5 || style="text-align:left;"| Andrew Higginson
| 6888 || 1400 || 450 || 1750 || 450 || 2100 || 450 || 1150 || 2800 || 10550 || 17438
|-
| 44 || 26 || style="text-align:left;"| Ken Doherty
| 9569 || 1400 || 575 || 719 || 700 || 2100 || 575 || 575 || 1150 || 7794 || 17363
|-
| 45 || 1 || style="text-align:left;"| Marcus Campbell
| 8200 || 1150 || 450 || 1438 || 1400 || 1725 || 1150 || 450 || 900 || 8663 || 16863
|-
| 46 || 17 || style="text-align:left;"| Martin Gould
| 6413 || 900 || 325 || 407 || 900 || 2100 || 1900 || 900 || 2800 || 10232 || 16645
|-
| 47 || 11 || style="text-align:left;"| Mark Davis
| 6713 || 1900 || 900 || 1125 || 1400 || 2100 || 325 || 325 || 1800 || 9875 || 16588
|-
| 48 || 2 || style="text-align:left;"| Jimmy Michie
| 7975 || 450 || 450 || 1750 || 1150 || 1725 || 450 || 1150 || 900 || 8025 || 16000
|-
| 49 || 1 || style="text-align:left;"| Tom Ford
| 7650 || 450 || 1400 || 1438 || 450 || 675 || 1150 || 450 || 2300 || 8313 || 15963
|-
| 50 || 6 || style="text-align:left;"| Andy Hicks
| 5900 || 900 || 1900 || 407 || 1150 || 1725 || 1150 || 900 || 1800 || 9932 || 15832
|-
| 51 || 8 || style="text-align:left;"| David Gilbert
| 7650 || 1400 || 450 || 1750 || 450 || 675 || 1900 || 450 || 900 || 7975 || 15625
|-
| 52 || 2 || style="text-align:left;"| Barry Pinches
| 9175 || 900 || 325 || 407 || 1900 || 488 || 1400 || 325 || 650 || 6395 || 15570
|-
| 53 || 14 || style="text-align:left;"| John Parrott
| 7825 || 450 || 0 || 2375 || 1150 || 675 || 450 || 1400 || 900 || 7400 || 15225
|-
| 54 || 1 || style="text-align:left;"| Paul Davies
| 6888 || 325 || 325 || 1125 || 1150 || 488 || 1400 || 325 || 2300 || 7438 || 14326
|-
| 55 || 4 || style="text-align:left;"| Robert Milkins
| 6250 || 325 || 325 || 407 || 2500 || 1350 || 900 || 1400 || 650 || 7857 || 14107
|-
| 56 || 9 || style="text-align:left;"| Jimmy White
| 5788 || 1150 || 1400 || 1125 || 325 || 1350 || 1400 || 200 || 1300 || 8250 || 14038
|-
| 57 || 2 || style="text-align:left;"| Mark Joyce
| 7563 || 900 || 1150 || 1125 || 900 || 488 || 900 || 325 || 650 || 6438 || 14001
|-
| 58 || 6 || style="text-align:left;"| David Morris
| 6038 || 325 || 1150 || 407 || 1150 || 1350 || 900 || 325 || 1800 || 7407 || 13445
|-
| 59 || 2 || style="text-align:left;"| Liu Song
| 8475 || 900 || 325 || 407 || 325 || 488 || 325 || 325 || 1800 || 4895 || 13370
|-
| 60 ||  || style="text-align:left;"| Jin Long
| 5088 || 200 || 650 || 1438 || 650 || 1350 || 650 || 1150 || 1800 || 7888 || 12976
|-
| 61 || 1 || style="text-align:left;"| Rod Lawler
| 4913 || 900 || 1150 || 407 || 1400 || 488 || 325 || 1400 || 1800 || 7870 || 12783
|-
| 62 || 10 || style="text-align:left;"| David Roe
| 8300 || 900 || 325 || 407 || 325 || 488 || 900 || 325 || 650 || 4320 || 12620
|-
| 63 || 2 || style="text-align:left;"| Joe Delaney
| 5276 || 900 || 325 || 407 || 900 || 1725 || 900 || 325 || 1800 || 7282 || 12558
|-
| 64 ||  || style="text-align:left;"| Peter Lines
| 5088 || 650 || 650 || 1125 || 1150 || 975 || 650 || 650 || 1300 || 7150 || 12238
|-
| 65 || 16 || style="text-align:left;"| David Gray
| 6888 || 1150 || 450 || 407 || 450 || 488 || 325 || 1400 || 650 || 5320 || 12208
|-
| 66 || 11 || style="text-align:left;"| Ian Preece
| 6525 || 900 || 1150 || 407 || 325 || 488 || 1400 || 325 || 650 || 5645 || 12170
|-
| 67 || 1 || style="text-align:left;"| Matthew Selt
| 5288 || 650 || 900 || 1125 || 650 || 1350 || 650 || 200 || 1300 || 6825 || 12113
|-
| 68 || 1 || style="text-align:left;"| Lee Spick
| 5350 || 650 || 900 || 250 || 325 || 1350 || 650 || 200 || 2300 || 6625 || 11975
|-
| 69 ||  || style="text-align:left;"| Matthew Couch
| 5088 || 650 || 900 || 250 || 900 || 1350 || 200 || 200 || 2300 || 6750 || 11838
|-
| 70 ||  || style="text-align:left;"| Daniel Wells
| 5088 || 650 || 650 || 250 || 900 || 300 || 900 || 650 || 2300 || 6600 || 11688
|-
| 71 ||  || style="text-align:left;"| Li Hang
| 5088 || 900 || 650 || 1125 || 650 || 975 || 900 || 650 || 400 || 6250 || 11338
|-
| 72 ||  || style="text-align:left;"| Simon Bedford
| 5088 || 650 || 650 || 1750 || 200 || 300 || 200 || 650 || 1800 || 6200 || 11288
|-
| 73 || 4 || style="text-align:left;"| Patrick Wallace
| 5275 || 650 || 200 || 250 || 200 || 975 || 650 || 1150 || 1800 || 5875 || 11150
|-
| 74 || 20 || style="text-align:left;"| Andrew Norman
| 5513 || 900 || 900 || 1125 || 325 || 488 || 325 || 900 || 650 || 5613 || 11126
|-
| 75 ||  || style="text-align:left;"| Atthasit Mahitthi
| 5088 || 200 || 900 || 1125 || 1150 || 975 || 200 || 900 || 400 || 5850 || 10938
|-
| 76 || 5 || style="text-align:left;"| James McBain
| 5150 || 650 || 650 || 813 || 200 || 300 || 200 || 1150 || 1300 || 5263 || 10413
|-
| 77 || 7 || style="text-align:left;"| Rodney Goggins
| 5163 || 650 || 200 || 250 || 650 || 1350 || 650 || 200 || 1300 || 5250 || 10413
|-
| 78 ||  || style="text-align:left;"| Jamie Jones
| 5088 || 650 || 200 || 250 || 650 || 1350 || 200 || 200 || 1800 || 5300 || 10388
|-
| 79 ||  || style="text-align:left;"| Stephen Craigie
| 5088 || 200 || 900 || 813 || 650 || 300 || 900 || 650 || 400 || 4813 || 9901
|-
| 80 ||  || style="text-align:left;"| Kuldesh Johal
| 5088 || 650 || 650 || 250 || 200 || 1350 || 200 || 900 || 400 || 4600 || 9688
|-
| 81 ||  || style="text-align:left;"| Vincent Muldoon
| 5088 || 200 || 650 || 1125 || 900 || 300 || 650 || 200 || 400 || 4425 || 9513
|-
| 82 || 10 || style="text-align:left;"| Supoj Saenla
| 5088 || 200 || 200 || 1125 || 200 || 975 || 200 || 200 || 1300 || 4400 || 9488
|-
| 83 ||  || style="text-align:left;"| Andy Lee
| 5088 || 200 || 900 || 1125 || 200 || 300 || 200 || 900 || 400 || 4225 || 9313
|-
| 84 ||  || style="text-align:left;"| Aditya Mehta
| 5088 || 200 || 200 || 1125 || 200 || 300 || 900 || 900 || 400 || 4225 || 9313
|-
| 85 ||  || style="text-align:left;"| Andrew Pagett
| 5088 || 650 || 200 || 250 || 650 || 300 || 200 || 650 || 1300 || 4200 || 9288 
|-
| 86 ||  || style="text-align:left;"| Lewis Roberts
| 5088 || 200 || 200 || 250 || 650 || 300 || 650 || 650 || 1300 || 4200 || 9288
|-
| 87 || 21 || style="text-align:left;"| Scott MacKenzie
| 5413 || 0 || 200 || 813 || 325 || 975 || 200 || 900 || 400 || 3813 || 9226
|-
| 88 ||  || style="text-align:left;"| Robert Stephen
| 5088 || 200 || 900 || 250 || 900 || 300 || 200 || 900 || 400 || 4050 || 9138
|-
| 89 ||  || style="text-align:left;"| Paul Davison
| 5088 || 200 || 650 || 250 || 650 || 975 || 650 || 200 || 400 || 3975 || 9063
|-
| 90 ||  || style="text-align:left;"| Wayne Cooper
| 5088 || 650 || 200 || 250 || 200 || 300 || 650 || 200 || 1300 || 3750 || 8838
|-
| 91 ||  || style="text-align:left;"| Stefan Mazrocis
| 5088 || 200 || 200 || 813 || 900 || 300 || 650 || 200 || 400 || 3263 || 8751
|-
| 92 || 19 || style="text-align:left;"| Liu Chuang
| 4650 || 900 || 200 || 250 || 200 || 1725 || 200 || 200 || 400 || 4075 || 8725
|-
| 93 ||  || style="text-align:left;"| David Grace
| 5088 || 200 || 200 || 1125 || 200 || 300 || 200 || 200 || 400 || 2825 || 7913
|-
| 94 ||  || style="text-align:left;"| Michael Georgiou
| 5088 || 200 || 200 || 250 || 200 || 300 || 200 || 200 || 400 || 1950 || 7038
|-
| 95 ||  || style="text-align:left;"| Chris McBreen
| 5088 || 200 || 200 || 250 || 200 || 300 || 200 || 200 || 400 || 1950 || 7038
|-
| 96 ||  || style="text-align:left;"| Declan Hughes
| 5088 || 200 || 200 || 250 || 0 || 300 || 0 || 200 || 400 || 1550 || 6638
|}

Notes

References

2008
Ranking points 2009
Ranking points 2008